Thomas Kindig (born 16 October 1996) is an Austrian footballer.

External links
 
 

1996 births
Living people
Austrian footballers
SC Wiener Neustadt players
First Vienna FC players
Association football midfielders